"All Stood Still" is Ultravox's fourth and final single from Vienna, the band's first album with Midge Ure, released on Chrysalis Records on 26 May 1981.

The single, on the back of "Vienna"'s success, hit No. 8 on the UK Singles Chart, giving Ultravox their second top-ten hit. There is currently no known music video available for the song, although the song was used to infectious effect in the first skateboarding video, Powell Peralta's promotional Skateboarding in the '80's, featuring Tony Hawk and Rodney Mullen.

The B-sides are two original instrumentals. "Keep Torque-ing" is listed on the Rare, Vol. 1 compilation as "Keep Talking"; it is generally accepted that the latter was the correct name for the track. This track was a cassette recording during rehearsals.

Track listing

7" version 
 "All Stood Still" – 3:40
 "Alles Klar" – 4:53

12" version 
 "All Stood Still" (12" Version) – 5:05
 "Alles Klar" – 4:53
 "Keep Torque-ing" (cassette recording during rehearsals) – 6:21

References

1980 songs
1981 singles
Ultravox songs
Songs written by Midge Ure
Songs written by Warren Cann
Songs written by Chris Cross
Songs written by Billy Currie
Chrysalis Records singles